Ferron (born 1952) is a Canadian singer-songwriter.

Ferron may also refer to:

People 
 Ferron (footballer) (Luiz Antonio Linhares Garcia, born 1985), Brazilian footballer
 Christophe Ferron (born 1970), French football manager and former player
 Damián Ferrón, Argentine businessman killed in the triple crime
 Dani Ferron (born 1980), Andorran footballer
 Fabrizio Ferron (born 1965), former Italian footballer
 Francis Ferrón (born 1990), Spanish footballer 
 Isabelle Ferron (born 1967), film and stage actress
 Jacques Ferron (1921–1985), Canadian physician and author
 J.-Émile Ferron (1896–1970), lawyer and federal Quebec politician
 Jordi Ferrón (born 1978), Spanish footballer
 Julio Ferrón (born 1988), Uruguayan footballer
 Louis Ferron (1942–2005), Dutch novelist and poet
 Madeleine Ferron (1922–2010), Quebec writer
 Marcelle Ferron (1924–2001), Québécoise painter and stained glass artist
 Marie Rose Ferron (1902–1936),  Canadian-American Roman Catholic mystic and stigmatist
 Ralph Ferron (born 1972),  Luxembourg footballer 
 Valentin Ferron (born 1998), French cyclist
 Ferron Williams (born 1955), Maroon politician and former Colonel-in-Chief of Accompong, Jamaica

Other uses 
 Ferron, Utah, an American city
 Ferron Formation, a geologic formation in Utah

See also
Ferren, given name and surname
Ferrin, given name and surname